Hosh Bannaga, 150 kilometres north of the capital Khartoum, is a village located in the outskirts of Shendi on the east bank of the Nile River in the River Nile state. It is the birthplace of former President Omar al-Bashir.

References

Populated places in River Nile (state)
Villages in Sudan